Angel Rusev may refer to:
 Angel Rusev (footballer)
 Angel Rusev (weightlifter)